Desperado Corner is a play written for the stage by English playwright Shaun Lawton. It started out as a collection of performance poems and monologues written and performed by Lawton in London between 1973 and 1976. It is set in the seaside town of Redcar in the north east of England in 1959.

It premiered at the Citizens Theatre, in Glasgow, on 16 January 1981, with Di Trevis directing. Among the cast were Gary Oldman, Jim Cartwright and Mark Rylance.

It was staged that same year at the Citizens, this time directed by Robert David MacDonald.

That same year, 1981, there was also a production of the play by final year students at the Royal Academy of Dramatic Art at their Vanbrugh Theatre in London.

References 

British plays